The 2018 Poprad-Tatry ATP Challenger Tour was a professional tennis tournament played on clay courts. It was the fourth edition of the tournament which was part of the 2018 ATP Challenger Tour. It took place in Poprad, Slovakia between 18 and 23 June 2018.

Singles main-draw entrants

Seeds

 1 Rankings are as of 11 June 2018.

Other entrants
The following players received wildcards into the singles main draw:
  Andrej Glváč
  Lukáš Klein
  Dominik Šproch
  Peter Vajda

The following players received entry from the qualifying draw:
  Frank Dancevic
  Andreas Haider-Maurer
  Pavel Nejedlý
  Jan Šátral

Champions

Singles

  Jozef Kovalík def.  Arthur De Greef 6–4, 6–0.

Doubles

  Tomislav Brkić /  Ante Pavić def.  Nikola Čačić /  Luca Margaroli 6–3, 4–6, [16–14].

References

2018 ATP Challenger Tour
2018
2018 in Slovak tennis
June 2018 sports events in Europe